Jacques Marilossian (born 26 July 1958) is a French politician of La République En Marche! (LREM) who was elected to the French National Assembly on 18 June 2017, representing the department of Hauts-de-Seine.

Early life and career
The grandchild of immigrants who survived the Armenian genocide, Marilossian holds degrees in engineering from École Centrale Paris (ECP), public service from Sciences Po Paris, and economics from University of Paris 1 Pantheon-Sorbonne. Before entering politics, he worked as an independent consultant on information systems strategy for companies in the energy sector. Marilossian is also a member of the board of directors of the Institute of Advanced Studies in National Defence (IHEDN).

Political career
In parliament, Marilossian serves on the Defense Committee. In addition to his committee assignments, he is a member of the French-Armenian Parliamentary Friendship Group and of the French delegation to the Assemblée parlementaire de la Francophonie.

Political positions
In July 2019, Marilossian voted in favour of the French ratification of the European Union’s Comprehensive Economic and Trade Agreement (CETA) with Canada.

In late 2019, Marilossian was one of 17 members of the Defense Committee who co-signed a letter to Prime Minister Édouard Philippe in which they warned that the 365 million euro ($406 million) sale of aerospace firm Groupe Latécoère to U.S. fund Searchlight Capital raised “questions about the preservation of know-how and France’s defense industry base” and urged government intervention.

See also
 2017 French legislative election

References

1958 births
Living people
Deputies of the 15th National Assembly of the French Fifth Republic
La République En Marche! politicians
People from Le Puy-en-Velay
Socialist Party (France) politicians
École Centrale Paris alumni
Sciences Po alumni
French people of Armenian descent
Members of Parliament for Hauts-de-Seine